The Slovak women's national under 18 ice hockey team is the national under-18 ice hockey team in Slovakia. The team represents Slovakia at the International Ice Hockey Federation's Ice Hockey U18 Women's World Championship.

U18 Women's World Championship record

*Includes one loss in overtime (in the round robin)
^Includes one win in overtime (in the round robin)

Team

Current roster
Roster for the 2023 IIHF Ice Hockey U18 Women's World Championship.

Head coach: Miroslav MosnárAssistant coaches: , Dušan Vlk

Head coaches
 Miroslav Karafiát, 2008–09
 Igor Andrejkovič, 2009–10
 Stanislav Kubuš, 2010–2012
 Ján Valúch, 2012–2015
 Tomáš Pšenka, 2015–16
 Peter Kúdelka, 2016–2020
 Gabriela Sabolová, 2021–22
 Miroslav Mosnár, 2022–

References

External links
Slovakia at IIHF.com
 Official Website

Women's national under-18 ice hockey teams
under